Your Dollar Store with More Inc. is a Canadian chain of variety stores based in Kelowna, British Columbia.

History 
The chain began with a single store in 1998, founded by Russ and Sherry Meszaros. The chain expanded quickly in the early 2000s, and by 2003 it had grown to 140 stores in Canada and 23 in the United States. The chain's expansion was fueled by a combination of a low franchise fee ($15,000 CAD), and a wide selection of products, including those above $1, which the company claims is part of what makes it a "higher-end concept". By 2004, the chain had grown to 175 stores, becoming the second-largest franchised dollar store in the country, then behind the Ontario-based A Buck or Two. The chain is now considered the largest franchised dollar store in Canada.

References

External links
Your Dollar Store With More

Companies based in Kelowna
Discount stores of Canada
Retail companies established in 1998
Variety stores
1998 establishments in British Columbia